A nucleated village, or clustered settlement, is one of the main types of settlement pattern. It is one of the terms used by geographers and landscape historians to classify settlements. It is most accurate with regard to planned settlements: its concept is one in which the houses, even most farmhouses within the entire associated area of land, such as a parish, cluster around a central church, which is close to the village green.  Other focal points can be substituted depending on cultures and location, such as a commercial square, circus, crescent, a railway station, park or a sports stadium.

A clustered settlement contrasts with these:

dispersed settlement
linear settlement
polyfocal settlement, two (or more) adjacent nucleated villages that have expanded and merged to form a cohesive overall community

A sub-category of clustered settlement is a planned village or community, deliberately established by landowners or the stated and enforced planning policy of local authorities and central governments.

England
One example of a nucleated village in England is Shapwick, Somerset.

Many nucleated villages originated in Anglo-Saxon England, but historian W. G. Hoskins discredits a previously held view that uniquely associated nucleated villages with that influx to England and their emergent society.

In England, nucleated settlements prevail for example in central parts of the country away from the rockiest soil and steepest slopes where open field farming predominated. In this landscape, the village was typically surrounded by two (or three) large fields in which villagers had individual strips – see open field system. Various explanations have been offered as to the reason for this form of settlement including the ethnic origin of the Anglo-Saxon settlers, density of population and the influence of local lords of the manor. Tom Williamson theorised in 2004 that the best explanation is the combination of soil quality and climate which leads to differences in agricultural techniques for exploiting local conditions.

Planned settlements can be clearly distinguished from other communities in the late medieval period when landowners began to en masse allocate two rows of new houses set on equal-sized plots of land - burgage plots. At the opposite end of the burgage plot there is often a back lane which gives the original village a regular layout, right-angled development, which can often still be seen today in England. Planned villages were usually associated with markets, from which the landowner expected to make profits.

Central Europe
In central Europe, nucleated villages have also emerged from smaller settlements and many farmsteads (equivalent to many hamlets) also grew into societal communities with growth in population.  These villages generally have an irregular shape but are roughly circular around a central place and/or church as their epicenter. The central place is usually a lake or somewhere easy to defend.

Further reading
 Daniel R. Curtis, 'The emergence of concentrated villages in medieval Western Europe: Explanatory frameworks in the historiography'

Notes and references
Notes 
 
References

Landscape history
Types of village

de:Dorf#Haufendorf